Pheosia rimosa, the black-rimmed prominent moth, fissured prominent or false-sphinx, is a moth of the family Notodontidae. The species was first described by Alpheus Spring Packard in 1864. It is found from coast to coast in North America, although it is less common in the south-eastern United States.

The wingspan is 43–62 mm. Adults are dark black-brown and white. The forewings are white with a dark strip along the costa and along the entire lower margin. The hindwings are white with a dark blotch in the anal angle. Adults are on wing from spring to fall.

The larvae feed on the leaves of Populus and Salix species. They resemble young hornworm larvae of the family Sphingidae. The color is variable and can be yellow, lavender, pink, green, brown or nearly black. Full-grown larvae can reach a length of about 45 mm. The species overwinters in the pupal stage.

Subspecies
Pheosia rimosa rimosa
Pheosia rimosa taiwanognoma Nakamura, 1973 (Taiwan)

Taxonomy
Pheosia portlandia was previously treated as a distinct species, replacing P. rimosa in Pacific coastal forests. Research has concluded that Pheosia portlandia is a synonym of P. rimosa.

References

Moths described in 1864
Notodontidae
Moths of Japan
Moths of North America
Taxa named by Alpheus Spring Packard